Events from the year 1755 in art.

Events
 Canaletto returns from England to Venice, where he continues painting until his death in 1768.

Paintings

 Jean-Honoré Fragonard – Musical Contest (1754-1755)
 William Hogarth – Sealing the Tomb
 John Shackleton – George II (Scottish National Portrait Gallery, Edinburgh)

Births
 January 30 - Richard Collins, English chief miniature and enamel painter to George III (died 1831)
 February - Albert Christoph Dies, German painter and composer (died 1822)
 February 6 – Henry Bone, English enamel painter (died 1834)
 February 13 - Philibert-Louis Debucourt, French painter and engraver (died 1832)
 April 9 - William Birch, English miniature painter and engraver (died 1834)
 April 16 – Élisabeth-Louise Vigée-Le Brun, French painter (died 1842)
 July 6 – John Flaxman, sculptor (died 1826)
 July 14 - Charles-Antoine Clevenbergh, Flemish painter of still-life (died 1810)
 August 4 – Nicolas-Jacques Conté, painter and inventor of the pencil (died 1805)
 August 17 – Thomas Stothard, English painter and engraver (died 1834)
 September 8 - Petrus Johannes van Regemorter, Flemish landscape and genre painter (died 1830)
 November 16 - Marie Jeanne Clemens, Danish engraver and painter, member of Danish Academy of Fine Arts (died 1791)
 December 3 – Gilbert Stuart, American painter (died 1828)
 December 4 – Franz Caucig, Slovene painter and drawer (died 1828)
 date unknown
 Prince Hoare, English painter and dramatist (died 1834)
 Philip Jean, English miniaturist painter (died 1802)
 Luigi Mayer, Italian-German painter (died 1803)
 Filippo Pennino, Italian sculptor (died 1801)

Deaths
 March 6 – Pier Leone Ghezzi, Italian Rococo painter and caricaturist active in Rome (born 1674)
 April 30 – Jean-Baptiste Oudry, French Rococo painter, engraver and tapestry designer (born 1686)
 May 23 - Juan Antonio García de Bouzas, Spanish painter (born 1680)
 May 25 – Gustavus Hesselius, Swedish-American painter (born 1682)
 date unknown
 Pietro Anderlini, Italian painter of the Rococo period (born 1687)
 Li Fangying, Chinese painter from Jiangsu (born 1696)
 Jean-Louis Lemoyne, French sculptor (born 1665)
 Giovanni Agostino Ratti, Italian cabinet painter, engraver, and constructed scenography (born 1699)
 Odoardo Vicinelli, Italian painter of the late-Baroque period (born 1684)
 probable (died 1755/1759) – Giuseppe Antonio Petrini, painter of Italian or Lombard heritage (born 1677)

References

 
Years of the 18th century in art
1750s in art